Trinity Episcopal Cathedral in Miami, Florida is the cathedral church of the Episcopal Diocese of Southeast Florida. It is located at North Bayshore Drive and the Venetian Causeway near the Carnival Center in Miami (464 NE 16th Street, 33132). On October 10, 1980, it was added to the U.S. National Register of Historic Places.

National Register listing
Trinity Episcopal Cathedral
(added 1980 - Building - #80000945)
464 NE 16th St., Miami
Historic Significance: 	Architecture/Engineering
Architect, builder, or engineer: Mundy, Harold Hastings
Architectural Style: 	Romanesque
Area of Significance: 	Architecture
Period of Significance: 	1900-1924
Owner: 	Private
Historic Function: 	Religion
Historic Sub-function: 	Religious Structure
Current Function: 	Religion
Current Sub-function: 	Religious Structure

History
Trinity Cathedral is the oldest church in the original city limits of Miami, having been organized by the Rt. Rev. William Crane Gray on June 12, 1896, more than a month before the city was incorporated. In 1904, the Trinity Mission became self-supporting and thus achieved parish status. The wooden church building was replaced in 1912 by an imposing, two-story stone church, similar in design to St. Paul's Episcopal Church in Key West.

In 1923, as the great Miami and Florida real estate boom of the roaring twenties neared its peak, the congregation bought land at the corner of NE Bayshore Drive and 15th Street for the site of a church large enough to seat eleven hundred worshipers. Miami architect Harold Hastings Mundy designed the new church, whose construction was finished in July, 1925. The proportions of the building and its general idea were inspired by the Roman Catholic Church of St. Giles, near Nîmes in southern France. Muncy combined Romanesque, Byzantine, and Italianate elements of architecture to give the building a distinctive Mediterranean appearance. When the boom collapsed in 1927, Trinity Church was saddled with a large mortgage debt, which was not paid until 1946, after almost twenty years of sacrifice and struggle.

The interior of the Cathedral contains a profusion of finely wrought mosaics which depict the six days of creation, the hosts of heaven, and the Stations of the Cross. In addition, stained glass windows illustrate events in the life of Jesus with corresponding scenes from the Old Testament, the miracles of Jesus, the Song of the Three Young Men (the Benedictus es), the seven sacraments of the church, and many of the saints and scholars of the British Isles before the Protestant Reformation. The Cathedral interior has a sound reverberation of more than four seconds, a feature which greatly enhances the musical effectiveness of the cathedral's E. M. Skinner/Æolian Skinner pipe organ of fifty-six ranks. and makes it one of the "warmest" rooms for music.

In 1970, the delegates to the first convention of the new Episcopal Diocese of Southeast Florida voted to make Trinity Church the cathedral for the diocese, the location of the bishop's throne, the cathedra. In 1980, the cathedral was judged to be of such architectural and historical significance that it was placed on the U. S. Department of the Interior's Register of National Historic Places.

Sunday service schedule
  8:00 am  - Holy Eucharist (Communion), Rite I
 10:00 am  - Holy Eucharist (Communion), Rite II with music from the Cathedral Choir
 12:15pm  - Santa Misa (Holy Eucharist in Spanish)

Weekday service schedule
 12:05 pm  - Holy Eucharist in All Saints Chapel

See also

List of the Episcopal cathedrals of the United States
List of cathedrals in Florida

References

 Much of the above information comes from the text of David Willing, Cathedral Historian and Archivist.

External links

 Trinity Cathedral Website
 Episcopal Diocese of Southeast Florida Website
 The Episcopal Church Welcomes You
 Trinity Cathedral Calendar on Zvents
 Dade County listings at National Register of Historic Places
 Florida's Office of Cultural and Historical Programs
 Dade County listings
 Trinity Episcopal Cathedral
 Whitechapel Bell Foundry - Radial Bellframes

Churches on the National Register of Historic Places in Florida
National Register of Historic Places in Miami
Episcopal church buildings in Florida
Churches in Miami
History of Miami
Episcopal cathedrals in Florida
1925 establishments in Florida
Churches completed in 1925